Marcin Leopolita (also Marcin z Lwowa; 1537) was one of the most eminent Polish composers of the 16th century. He attended the Jagiellonian University (Collegium Maius) and may have studied under the Polish composer Sebastian z Felsztyna and Jan Jelen of Tuchola. 

He was born in Lwów in Kingdom of Poland (now Lviv, Ukraine). By the age of 20 he was a member of the royal music ensemble at the court of Zygmunt August, King of Poland and Grand Duke of Lithuania. apparently becoming court composer there in 1560.

Few compositions of Leopolita have survived. Four motets, written in Latin, (Cibavit eos, Mihi autem, Resurgente Christo and Spiritus Domini) are preserved in organ tablature; of these, Cibavit Eos can be restored with confidence to its original vocal form.  All four works are known from a single source, a tablature formerly belonging to the Warsaw Musicological Society which now only survives as a photographic copy, the original having been destroyed during World War Two. This tablature was probably written around 1580 and has been known as the Tablature of Martin Leopolita, although while Leopolita himself was an organist, his connection with the manuscript is uncertain.

Leopolita's five-part mass Missa paschalis is the only 16th century Polish mass to survive intact, and the  Agnus Dei, which adds a sixth voice (a second Cantus) has the distinction of being the earliest extant example of six-part Polish polyphony.  It is based on themes from four Polish vernacular Easter songs——hence the designation 'Paschalis'—of which Chrystus Pan zmartwychwstał is the most prominent.

Recordings
 Early Polish Masses Gorczycki: Missa Paschalis Leopolita: Missa Paschalis Mielczewski: Missa super "O Gloriosa Domina" Jaroslaw Malanowicz (organ) Il Canto CD Accord - ACD018
 Waclaw z Szamotul: Songs and Motets and Leopolita: Missa Paschalis Collegium Vocale Bydgoszcz Dux - DUX0248 recorded 1992 and 1994

References

1540s births
1580s deaths
Polish composers
Ukrainian classical composers
Jagiellonian University alumni
16th-century composers